Las fieras is a Mexican telenovela produced by Ernesto Alonso for Televisa in 1972.

Cast 
Raquel Olmedo as Edith Brisson 
Héctor Gómez as Pierre Brisson 
Anita Blanch as Madame Brisson 
José Alonso as Jean Brisson 
Norma Lazareno as Helene 
Ricardo Blume as Richard 
Teresa Velázquez 
Miguel Manzano
Javier Ruán
Lorena Velázquez
David Estuardo
Dolores Beristáin
Lilia Aragón
Margarita Cortés
Carlos Arguelles as Jean Brisson as a child
José Antonio Ferral
Talina Fernández
Lola Berinstain

References

External links 

Mexican telenovelas
1972 telenovelas
Televisa telenovelas
Spanish-language telenovelas
1972 Mexican television series debuts
1972 Mexican television series endings